For the computer scientist, see Hans Hagen

Hans Hagen (15 July 1894 – 11 October 1957) was a German international footballer.

Club career 
Twice he was crowned German football champion with SpVgg Fürth in the 1920s.

International career 
Hagen won 12 caps between 1920 and 1930 for the Germany national team.

References

External links
 
 
 
 

1894 births
1957 deaths
Association football defenders
German footballers
Germany international footballers
German football managers
Sportspeople from Fürth
Footballers from Bavaria